
Gmina Ręczno is a rural gmina (administrative district) in Piotrków County, Łódź Voivodeship, in central Poland.

The gmina contains part of the protected area called Sulejów Landscape Park.

Villages
Gmina Ręczno contains the villages and settlements of Bąkowa Góra, Będzyn, Dęba, Kolonia Ręczno, Łęg Ręczyński, Łęki Królewskie, Majkowice, Nowinki, Paskrzyn, Ręczno, Stobnica, Stobnica-Piła, Wielkopole and Zbyłowice.

Neighbouring gminas
Gmina Ręczno is bordered by the gminas of Aleksandrów, Łęki Szlacheckie, Masłowice, Przedbórz, Rozprza and Sulejów.

References

Polish official population figures 2006

Reczno
Piotrków County